My Tutor Friend ( is a South Korean television series broadcast by MBC from October 2014 to April 2015. It is a program where the stars learn the chest choruses that they wanted to learn through private tutoring.

Broadcast timeline

Cast 
 Choi Hwa-jung
 Kim Bumsoo
 Hong Jin-young
 Kim Dong-jun
 BamBam
 Jung Jae-hyung
 Lee Jae-hoon
 Song Ga-yeon
 Kim Sung-ryung
 Sung Si-kyung
 Jeong Jun-ha
 Kim Hee-chul
 Song Jae-ho
 Jin Ji-hee
 Lee Jae-yong
 Sam Hammington
 Yang Han-yeol
 Lee Tae-im

Rating 
In the ratings below, the highest rating for the show will be in red, and the lowest rating for the show will be in blue.

Controversies 
In March 2015, while filming the show, Lee Tae-im and Kim Ye-won had a fight, with Lee Tae-im reportedly swearing at Kim Ye-won. After the incident, Lee Tae-im claimed that Kim Ye-won initiated the fight by using informal speech to address her, as informal speech is considered rude to be used while addressing older people and seniors in Korean culture. Despite her claims, Lee Tae-im received public backlash, which caused her to withdraw from My Tutor Friend and other TV shows she was in. She publicly apologized to Kim Ye-won and announced hiatus.

However, less than a month later, video footage of Lee Tae-im and Ye-won quarrelling began circulating on the Internet, proving Lee Tae-im's claims that Kim Ye-won used informal speech to address her. This caused the public sentiment to shift, with Kim Ye-won's remarks from the footage becoming a subject of various parodies. After the backlash, Kim Ye-won ultimately apologized to Lee Tae-im.

Awards and nominations

References 

2014 South Korean television series debuts
2015 South Korean television series endings
Korean-language television shows
South Korean variety television shows